Mexaphaenops is a genus of beetles in the family Carabidae, containing the following species:

 Mexaphaenops elegans Barr, 1967
 Mexaphaenops febriculosus Barr, 1982
 Mexaphaenops fiski Barr, 1967
 Mexaphaenops intermedius Barr, 1971
 Mexaphaenops jamesoni Barr, 1982
 Mexaphaenops mackenziei Barr, 1982
 Mexaphaenops prietoi Bolivar & Pieltain, 1942
 Mexaphaenops sulcifrons Barr, 1982

References

Trechinae